Beneath These Fireworks is the major label debut and fifth album by Matt Nathanson, released on October 14, 2003 on Universal Records. Shortly after its release, Nathanson was dropped from Universal thus causing the album to go mostly unnoticed.

Track listing
All songs written by Matt Nathanson/Mark Weinberg except where noted.

"Angel" – 1:32
"Suspended" (Nathanson/Weinberg/Eric Bazilian) – 3:09
"Sad Songs" – 3:53
"I Saw" – 3:54
"Bare" – 3:05
"Little Victories" (Nathanson) – 2:38
"Pretty the World" – 3:07
"Curve of the Earth" – 3:29
"Bent" – 3:51
"Lucky Boy" – 4:10
"Weight of It All" (Nathanson) – 3:14
"Sing Me Sweet" – 4:06

Personnel 
 Matt Nathanson – vocals, background vocals, acoustic guitar, electric guitar
 David Garza - electric guitar, nylon string guitar, piano
 Ron Aniello - electric guitar, acoustic guitar, keyboards
 Sergio Andrade – bass
 Matt Chamberlain – drums, loops, percussion
 Jamie Muhoberac – keyboards, piano
 Matt Fish - cello
 Gunter Fliszar - percussion
 Glen Phillips - background vocals on "Pretty the World" and "Sad Songs"
 Mark Weinberg – bass on "Pretty the World" and "Sing Me Sweet"
 Emm Gryner - background vocals on "Sing Me Sweet"
 Marcus Barone - Conductor on "Little Victories"

References

2003 albums
Matt Nathanson albums
Albums produced by Ron Aniello